Coolbinia is a suburb of Perth, Western Australia. Its local government area is the City of Stirling.

The name Coolbinia is an Aboriginal word for mistletoe and the suburb was named when split from Mount Lawley in 1953.

References

Suburbs of Perth, Western Australia

Suburbs in the City of Vincent